Keisterville is an unincorporated community in Fayette County, Pennsylvania, United States. Keisterville has a post office with ZIP code 15449.

References

Unincorporated communities in Fayette County, Pennsylvania
Unincorporated communities in Pennsylvania